Welsh units of measurement are those in use in Wales between the Sub-Roman period (prior to which the Britons used Roman units) and the 13th-century Edwardian conquest (after which English units were imposed). Modern Wales no longer employs these units even for customary purposes but instead follows the custom as elsewhere in Britain of using a mixture of metric and Imperial units.

Length
In the Venedotian Code used in Gwynedd, the units of length were said to have been codified by Dyfnwal Moelmud but retained unchanged by Hywel Dda. The code provided for computing the units variously, as well as deriving them from grains of barley. In measuring milk and its legal worth, disputes over the length of the inch used in the container were to be resolved by the width of the judge's thumb. The code notes that in some areas of Wales, the rod used to compute the Welsh acre was not reckoned from feet but taken to be "as long as the tallest man in the [tref], with his hand above his head".

 3 barleycorns ( ,  ) = 1 inch
 3 inches ( ,  ) = 1 palm
 3 palms ( ,  ) = 1 foot
 3 feet ( ,  ,  "footlength") = 1 pace
 8 feet = 1 field yoke ( ) or second yoke ( ) 
 3 paces = 1 leap
 12 feet = 4 paces = 1 lateral yoke (  or )
 16 feet = 1 long yoke ( ,  ) = rod ( ,  )
 3 leaps ( ,  ) = 1 land
 1000 lands ( ,  ) = 1 mile ( ,  )

Area

In the Venedotian Code used in Gwynedd, the basic field unit was the Welsh acre or erw, whose legal description—its breadth as far as a man can reach in either direction with an ox-goad as long as the long yoke (16 Welsh feet) and its length "thirty times that measure"—is noted by Owen as ambiguous. He finds it more likely, however, that the "measure" to be multiplied thirty times is the width of the acre (that is, two long yokes) rather than a single long yoke.

Thus, at least in theory, 

 2 rods × 30 rods = 1 acre ≈ 1,440 square imperial yards, or2 rods × 60 rods = 1 acre ≈ 4,320 square imperial yards
 4 acres ( ,  ,  "tilled [land]") = 1 homestead
 4 homesteads ( ,  ) = 1 shareland
 4 sharelands ( ,  ) = 1 holding
 4 holdings ( ,  ) = 1 township
 4 townships ( ,  ) = 1 manor
  manors ( ,  ) = 1 commote
 2 commotes ( ,  ) = 1 cantref = 25,600 acres

although in fact the commutes and cantrefs were fixed political entities with quite various sizes. The 11th-century Bleddyn ap Cynfyn is also described as having changed the legal composition of the homestead for purposes of inheritance and so on, varying its size depending on the social status of the owner. The homestead of a nobleman was 12 Welsh acres, that of a serf ( ,  ) had 8, and that of a bondsman or slave ( ) had 4. The text, however, notes the uncommonness of this division and says it was generally understood as 4 acres regardless of status.

In the Dimetian Code used in southern Wales, the same divisions were reckoned differently:

 2 rods × 18 rods = 1 acre
 312 acres = 1 shareland
 3 sharelands held by serfs = 1 serf-town
 4 sharelands held in freehold = 1 free town
 7 serf-towns = 1 lowland manor ( ,  ) = 936 acres
 12 free towns ( ,  ) = 1 upland manor ( ,  ) = 1248 acres

Volume
 1 Hestawr = 2 Winchester bushels

Time

The Welsh seem to have used an eight- or nine-day week, rather than a seven-day one, long after their conversion to Christianity.

See also 
 Roman units
 English units
 Megalithic yard, a proposed measure employed by the British megalith builders
 Historical weights and measures

Notes

References

Citations

Bibliography
 . 
 .  & 
 .
 .
 .
 .

Units of measurement
History of Wales
Units of measurement by country